Canada competed at the 1992 Summer Paralympics in Barcelona, Spain. 138 competitors from Canada won 75 medals including 28 gold, 21 silver and 26 bronze, finishing 6th in the medal table.

Medalists

See also 
 Canada at the Paralympics
 Canada at the 1992 Summer Olympics

References 

1992
Nations at the 1992 Summer Paralympics
1992 in Canadian sports